Seaforth is a former unincorporated community in Chatham County, North Carolina, United States located on U.S. Highway 64. It lies at an elevation of 217 feet (66 m).

References

Unincorporated communities in Chatham County, North Carolina
Unincorporated communities in North Carolina